Rev. Dennis J. O'Donovan (died September 26, 1892) was an American Roman Catholic priest.

Early in his priesthood, O'Donovan was a curate at Saint Augustine's in South Boston.

O'Donovan announced on January 14, 1877, that Fr. John Brennan would be leaving St. Mary's Church in Dedham, Massachusetts and St. Catherine's in Norwood, which was part of the same parish. Many in the congregation had been unhappy with Brennan and the week before he became the first priest to ever file for bankruptcy. The parish was also bankrupt at the time. Donovan took over for Brennan as pastor, and served until August 1888. Donovan expanded and improved St. Catherine's during his time as pastor. When he resigned in 1878 due to failing health his parishioners presented him with a resolution expressing their thanks and $550.

On July 29, 1873, Donovan was commissioned as chaplain of the Ninth Regiment of the Massachusetts Militia. He served until April 1876, resigned, and then resumed his post in September of the same year. He resigned again in September 1879. In 1874 he was named chaplain for the prisoners at the Deer Island Prison. In 1875, he was a candidate for the Boston School Committee on the Democratic ticket. He was also a member of the Philo-Celtic Society.

In his final days he was an assistant at the Cathedral of the Holy Cross.
 He died at the Carney Hospital on September 26, 1892, and is buried in Saint Augustine Chapel and Cemetery. His funeral was attended by more than 100 priests.

Notes

References

Works cited

Year of birth missing
1882 deaths
American Roman Catholic priests
People from South Boston
Clergy from Dedham, Massachusetts
Massachusetts militia
Roman Catholic clergy from Boston
Burials in Massachusetts